The FIFA Football Stakeholders Committee is one of the nine standing committees of FIFA. It deals with the structure of the game between players, clubs, leagues, associations, and confederations within FIFA.

Membership

References

FIFA Committees